Risto Björlin (born 1944) was a Finnish wrestler. He was born in Vaasa. He won an Olympic bronze medal in Greco-Roman wrestling in 1972. He also competed at the 1964 and 1968 Summer Olympics.

References

External links
 

1944 births
Living people
Olympic wrestlers of Finland
Wrestlers at the 1964 Summer Olympics
Wrestlers at the 1968 Summer Olympics
Wrestlers at the 1972 Summer Olympics
Finnish male sport wrestlers
Olympic bronze medalists for Finland
Olympic medalists in wrestling
Medalists at the 1972 Summer Olympics
Sportspeople from Vaasa
20th-century Finnish people
21st-century Finnish people